Castang may refer to:

 Jeanne-Germaine Castang (1878-1897), French nun, Sister Marie-Céline of the Presentation, beatified in 2007
 Veronica Castang (1938—1988), British film, stage and television actress
 Henri Castang, a fictional detective in works by Nicolas Freeling
 Mauzac-et-Grand-Castang, a commune in the Dordogne department in Aquitaine in southwestern France

See also
 Castaing
 Casting (disambiguation)